Doolie is a populated place within the town of Mooresville in Iredell County, North Carolina, United States.

Geography

Doolie is located at latitude 35.602 and longitude -80.897. The elevation of Doolie is 869 feet.

Demographics

References

External links

Unincorporated communities in Iredell County, North Carolina
Unincorporated communities in North Carolina